Fluvanna County Courthouse Historic District is a national historic district located at Palmyra, Fluvanna County, Virginia.  The district encompasses four contributing buildings. The courthouse was built in 1830–1831, and is a two-story, brick building in the form of a tetrastyle Roman Doric temple. It is five bays deep.  The other contributing buildings are a small lawyer's office (c. 1830) used as the Fluvanna County library and the stone jail house (1829), now the county museum.

It was added to the National Register of Historic Places in 1971.

References

External links
Fluvanna County Jail, Palmyra, Fluvanna County, VA: 9 measured drawings at Historic American Buildings Survey

Historic American Buildings Survey in Virginia
Courthouses on the National Register of Historic Places in Virginia
Historic districts in Fluvanna County, Virginia
County courthouses in Virginia
National Register of Historic Places in Fluvanna County, Virginia
Historic districts on the National Register of Historic Places in Virginia
Government buildings completed in 1831
Government buildings completed in 1829